Ainslie Beric "Joe" Gould (24 January 1909 –  2 November 1994) was an Australian rower. He was an Australian national champion who competed in the men's eight event at the 1936 Summer Olympics.

Club and state rowing
Gould was educated at Sydney Grammar School where he took up rowing. He rowed for the New South Wales Police Club in Sydney and along with three other police rowers was selected to the New South Wales state eight which contested and won the 1935 King's Cup.  In 1938 he again rowed in the New South Wales men's eight at the Interstate Regatta.

International representative rowing
In 1936 the NSW Police Club's eight dominated the Sydney racing season, the New South Wales state titles and won the Henley-on-Yarra event. They were selected in toto as Australia's men's eight to compete at the 1936 Berlin Olympics with their attendance funded by the NSW Police Federation.  The Australian eight with Gould rowing at seven finished fourth in the heat, behind Hungary, Italy and Canada. They failed to move through the repechage to the final.

In 1938 Gould was one of five New South Welshman selected in the men's eight for the 1938 Commonwealth Games. That eight, with Gould rowing in the seven seat, took the silver medal behind the British crew.

References

External links
 

1909 births
1994 deaths
Australian male rowers
Olympic rowers of Australia
Rowers at the 1936 Summer Olympics
Commonwealth Games medallists in rowing
Commonwealth Games silver medallists for Australia
Rowers at the 1938 British Empire Games
People from Moree, New South Wales
Sportsmen from New South Wales
20th-century Australian people
Medallists at the 1938 British Empire Games